Tuah Pahoe Stadium is the name of a football stadium in the city of Palangka Raya, Central Kalimantan, Indonesia. It was named after the tenth Mayor of Palangka Raya City is used as the home venue for Kalteng Putra of the Liga Indonesia. The stadium has a capacity of 10,000.

References

Football venues in Indonesia
Buildings and structures in Central Kalimantan
Sport in Central Kalimantan